Conica are a cnidarian suborder of the Leptomedusae (thecate hydroids).  They make up the bulk of their order; their internal relationships are not well resolved, and most of the roughly 30 families are not yet assigned to a superfamily.

They are named for the distinctive shape of their hypostome, the "tip" of the polyps' body where the mouth is located. As opposed to the smaller thecate suborder Proboscidoidea with their elongated hypostome, the Conica have a simple hypostome without a pregastric cavity and a shape that is generally round or conical.

Well-known members of the Conica are the "air fern" (Sertilaria argentea) of the Sertulariidae which is sold dried as novelty "plants" and aquarium ornaments, and the Crystal Jelly (Aequorea victoria) of the Aequoreidae, a bioluminescent hydrozoan.

Systematics 
Apart from the families assigned to the three named superfamilies, there are many Conica that are presently unassigned as to superfamily, either because their relationships and/or validity remain unknown or because they represent minor but very ancient lineages basal to the three main radiations within this order:

Basal and incertae sedis
 Family Aequoreidae
 Family Barcinidae
 Family Clathrozoellidae (often included in Clathrozoidae or placed in Anthomedusae)
 Family Clathrozoidae Stechow, 1921
 Family Dipleurosomatidae
 Family Eirenidae (including Eutimidae, Timoididae)
 Family Haleciidae
 Family Lafoeidae (including Hebellidae)
 Family Laodiceidae
 Family Lovenellidae (including Eucheilotidae)
 Family Malagazziidae
 Family Melicertidae
 Family Mitrocomidae Haeckel, 1879
 Family Octocannoidae
 Family Orchistomatidae
 Family Phialellidae
 Family Sugiuridae
 Family Syntheciidae
 Family Teclaiidae
 Family Tiarannidae
 Family Tiaropsidae Boero, Bouillon & Danovaro, 1987
 Family Zygophylaxidae (often included in Lafoeidae)

Superfamily Campanulinoidea (disputed)
 Family Blackfordiidae
 Family Calycellidae (often included in Campanulinidae)
 Family Campanulinidae
 Family Lineolariidae (often included in Campanulinidae)

Superfamily Plumularioidea (4 families)

Superfamily Sertularioidea
 Family Sertulariidae Fleming, 1828
 Family Thyroscyphidae

Footnotes

References 
  (2008): Conica. Retrieved 2008-JUL-08.
  (2008): The Hydrozoa Directory - Suborder Conica Broch, 1910. Retrieved 2008-JUL-08.

Leptothecata
Cnidarian suborders